The Special Jury Prize (Sarajevo Film Festival) is an award given at the Sarajevo Film Festival. It is considered the second place award next to the main award, the Heart of Sarajevo. It is awarded in two categories: feature film and documentary film. The Special Jury Prize for feature film is provided by agnès b., long-time partner and friend of Sarajevo Film Festival.

Award winners

Feature film

Documentary film

External links
Sarajevo Film Festival - Official Website
IMDb: Sarajevo Film Festival - SFF at IMDb 

Lists of films by award
Sarajevo Film Festival
Bosnia and Herzegovina film awards